Frozen with Fear is a 2000 Canadian crime/mystery film starring Bo Derek, Stephen Shellen and Wayne Rogers.

The picture was filmed in and around Fredericton, New Brunswick.

Synopsis
Katherine Sullivan, a severe agoraphobic, witnesses the murder of her husband and speaks with the investigating detective. Then both the body and the detective disappear. Katherine hires private investigator Jack Mize to figure out, only Mize isn't so sure that Katherine's version of reality is the truth.

Cast
Bo Derek as Katherine Sullivan
Stephen Shellen as Jack Mize
Wayne Rogers as Charles Sullivan III
Andrew Lambert as Darnell the street kid
Dawn McKelvie Cyr as Sarah Harper
Steven Morgan as Detective Bob Kelsey
Wally MacKinnon as Detective-Sergeant Al Sanderstin / Albert Heyes
Peggy Gedeon as Charlene
Janet Monid as Dr Eberson
Shawn Fitch as Dr Becker
Bryan McSorley as Andy
Mark A. Owen as Lt. Jennings

Notes

External links

Production Company (Milagro Films)

2001 films
2000s crime drama films
2000s mystery films
Films directed by Paul Lynch
Canadian crime drama films
Canadian mystery films
English-language Canadian films
Agoraphobia in fiction
Canadian detective films
2000s English-language films
2000s Canadian films